The CMC Leadca is a cab forward 3.5 ton truck designed and produced by Taiwanese automaker China Motor Corporation since 2013.

Overview
The Leadca is the first product that was sold under the brand name "CMC" without the Mitsubishi Motors badge. The truck bed is available in 10.7 ft standard version, 11.7 ft long version, and 13.8 super long versions. While the cargo bed frame is offered in standard and reinforced versions.

References

External links 

Cab over vehicles
Vehicles introduced in 2013
Trucks
Cars of Taiwan
Rear-wheel-drive vehicles